Ahimaaz was son and successor of Zadok in the office of high priest. ( 1 Chronicles 6:8 1 Chronicles 6:53 )

Ahimaaz may also refer to:
 Ahimaaz ben Paltiel (1017–1060), medieval chronicler
 Ahimaaz, father-in-law of Saul